Charles North may refer to:
 Charles North (poet) (born 1941), American poet, essayist and teacher
 Charles North (politician) (1887–1979), former Western Australian politician
 Charles North (MP), MP for Banbury

See also
St. Charles North High School (Illinois)
North (surname)